Ceramide synthase 2, also known as LAG1 longevity assurance homolog 2 or Tumor metastasis-suppressor gene 1 protein is an enzyme that in humans is encoded by the CERS2 gene.

Ceramide synthase 2 is a ceramide synthase that catalyses the synthesis of very long acyl chain ceramides, including C20 and C26 ceramides. It is the most ubiquitously expressed of all CerS and has the broadest distribution in the human body.

CerS2 was first identified in 2001. It contains the conserved TLC domain and Hox-like domain common to almost all CerS.

Distribution
CerS2 mRNA (TRH3) has been found in most tissues and it is strongly expressed in liver, intestine and brain. CerS2 is much more widely distributed than Ceramide synthase 1 (CerS1) and is found in at least 12 tissues in the human body, with high expression in the kidney and liver, and moderate expression in the brain and other organs. In the mouse brain, CerS2 is mainly expressed white matter tracts, specifically in oligodendrocytes and Schwann cells.

Function
Expression of CerS2 is transiently increased during periods of active myelination, suggesting that it is important for the synthesis of myelin sphingolipids. The lack of CerS2, as shown in knockout mice, induces the autophagy and activation of the unfolded protein response (UPR). These mice showed no decrease in overall ceramide level, but levels of sphinganine were elevated. They also developed severe liver disease, but there was no observable change in the kidneys.

The CerS2 gene is compact in size and is located in a chromosomal region that is replicated early in the cell cycle. CerS2 activity is regulated by sphingosine-1-phosphate (S1P) via two sphingosine-1-phosphate receptor-like residues on CerS2 that operate independently.

Pathological significance
CerS2 levels are significantly elevated in breast cancer tissue compared to normal tissue, along with increased levels of ceramide synthase 6 (CerS6).

CerS2 was also implicated in the control of body weight. The administration of leptin to rats induced a decrease in CerS2 was observed in white adipose tissue.

References

Further reading

Integral membrane proteins